is a former Japanese football player.

Playing career
Tsushima was born in Shizuoka Prefecture on July 30, 1974. After graduating from Shimizu Commercial High School, he joined Nagoya Grampus Eight in 1993. He played many matches as side back. However he retired end of 1995 season. In 2005, he came back as player at Regional Leagues club FC Gifu and played in 1 season.

Club statistics

References

External links

1974 births
Living people
Association football people from Shizuoka Prefecture
Japanese footballers
J1 League players
Nagoya Grampus players
FC Gifu players
Association football defenders